This article lists notable speakers of the Irish language (pl. Gaeilgeoirí).

List

The following non-natives have been known to use the Irish language:
 Stan Collymore
 Stephen Fry
 Charlie Day

See also
 Acadamh na hOllscolaíochta Gaeilge
 Conradh na Gaeilge
 Gaelic revival
 Gaeltacht
 List of Scottish Gaelic-speaking people
 RTÉ Raidió na Gaeltachta
 Taibhdhearc na Gaillimhe
 TG4

References

External links

People
Gaelgeoiri
Irish